225 Henrietta is a very large outer main-belt asteroid. It was discovered by Austrian astronomer Johann Palisa on April 19, 1882, in Vienna and named after Henrietta, wife of astronomer Pierre J. C. Janssen. The orbital plane is inclined at an angle of 20.9° to the plane of the ecliptic. 225 Henrietta belongs to Cybele group of asteroids and is probably in a 4:7 orbital resonance with the planet Jupiter.

This is classified as a C-type asteroid and is probably composed of primitive carbonaceous material. It has very dark surface, with an albedo of 0.040. This is consistent with a synodic rotation period of  determined in 2000. In 2001, the asteroid was detected by radar from the Arecibo Observatory at a distance of 1.58 AU.

References

External links 
 The Asteroid Orbital Elements Database
 Minor Planet Discovery Circumstances
 Asteroid Lightcurve Data File
 
 

F-type asteroids (Tholen)
Cybele asteroids
Henrietta
Henrietta
18820419